Role Play is an upcoming American thriller film directed by Thomas Vincent, written by Seth Owen, and produced by and starring Kaley Cuoco.

Premise
A married couple's lives are turned upside down when secrets are revealed about their pasts.

Cast
 Kaley Cuoco
 David Oyelowo
 Bill Nighy
 Connie Nielsen

Production
In July 2020, it was announced that StudioCanal and The Picture Company had acquired Role Play, a thriller spec script written by Seth Owen, based on an original idea by George Heller, to be produced by Alex Heineman and Andrew Rona. In July 2021, it was announced that Kaley Cuoco was in negotiations to star in the film, as well as produce alongside Heineman and Rona. in October 2021, it was announced that Thomas Vincent would direct the film, and Cuoco's roles as actor and producer were also confirmed.

Casting
In October 2021, it was confirmed that Kaley Cuoco would star in the film.

In June 2022, it was announced that David Oyelowo was cast as Cuoco's character's husband, and Billy Bob Thornton was cast as a "mysterious stranger who encounters the couple".

In July 2022, it was announced that Bill Nighy had replaced Thornton, who had to leave the film due to a schedule conflict. Connie Nielsen was also cast.

Filming
Principal photography began in July 2022 at Babelsberg Studio in Berlin, Germany.

Release
In June 2022, it was reported that Amazon Prime Video was in final negotiations to release the film in the United States and several international territories.

References

External links
 

Upcoming films
American thriller films
Babelsberg Studio films
Films shot in Berlin
StudioCanal films
Upcoming English-language films